The men's moguls event in freestyle skiing at the 1992 Winter Olympics in Albertville took place from 12 to 13 February at Tignes.

Results

Qualification
The top 16 advanced to the final.

Final

References

External links
Sports-Reference - 1992 Men's Moguls

Men's freestyle skiing at the 1992 Winter Olympics